The Women's sprint was held on 20 October 2012. 8 riders participated.

Medalists

Results

Qualifying
It was held at 10:40.

Quarterfinals
The races were held at 12:30 and 13:14.

Race for 5th–8th Places
It was held at 20:53.

Semifinals
The races were held at 19:30, 20:22 and 20:47.

Finals
The races were held at 21:06 and 21:33.

References

Women's sprint
European Track Championships – Women's sprint